Basis pursuit is the mathematical optimization problem of the form

 

where x is a N-dimensional solution vector (signal), y is a M-dimensional vector of observations (measurements), A is a M × N transform matrix (usually measurement matrix) and M < N.

It is usually applied in cases where there is an underdetermined system of linear equations y = Ax that must be exactly satisfied, and the sparsest solution in the L1 sense is desired.

When it is desirable to trade off exact equality of Ax and y in exchange for a sparser x, basis pursuit denoising is preferred.

Basis pursuit problems can be converted to linear programming problems in polynomial time and vice versa, making the two types of problems polynomially equivalent.

Equivalence to Linear Programming 
A basis pursuit problem can be converted to a linear programming problem by first noting that

where .

From this  expansion, the problem can be recast in canonical form as:

See also 
 Basis pursuit denoising
 Compressed sensing
 Frequency spectrum
 Group testing
 Lasso (statistics)
 Least-squares spectral analysis
 Matching pursuit
 Sparse approximation

Notes

References & further reading 
 Stephen Boyd, Lieven Vandenbergh: Convex Optimization, Cambridge University Press, 2004, pp. 337–337
 Simon Foucart, Holger Rauhut: A Mathematical Introduction to Compressive Sensing. Springer, 2013, pp. 77–110

External links 
 Shaobing Chen, David Donoho: Basis Pursuit
 Terence Tao: Compressed Sensing. Mahler Lecture Series (slides)

Mathematical optimization
Constraint programming